A state paper is a document or file kept by a government to record discussions, options and decisions by government officials, departments and civil servants. Some states follow a thirty year rule whereby state papers on an issue may be released to academic scrutiny thirty years after an original discussion or decision.

State papers are often kept in a country's National Archives, State Paper Office or Public Record Office. All files are numbered using an alphanumeric code which academics may use as a reference in footnotes of books.

Some state papers are embargoed for reasons of national security or other sensitive reasons.

See also
 British Public Record Office
 French Archives nationales
National Archives of Ireland
 United States National Archives and Records Administration
 Vatican Secret Archives

References

Government documents